Preston House, also known as Herondon and the John Montgomery Preston House, is a historic home located near Marion, Smyth County, Virginia. It was built in 1842, and is a two-story, five bay, brick Federal style dwelling.  It features two closely matched doorways with a transom and sidelights, framed and divided by slender Tuscan order columns with an entablature and Greek Revival block composition above.  The house was built "as a tavern or stagecoach inn along the Wilderness Road." This inn served travellers for some 22 years until 1864.

It was listed on the National Register of Historic Places in 1969.

In 2022, it was announced that the house is scheduled for demolition in order to build a truck stop.

References

Houses on the National Register of Historic Places in Virginia
Federal architecture in Virginia
Greek Revival houses in Virginia
Houses completed in 1842
Houses in Smyth County, Virginia
National Register of Historic Places in Smyth County, Virginia